Digby railway station was a railway station in Digby, Lincolnshire, which was open between 1882 and 1961.

History

Digby station closed for passengers on 11 September 1961  and freight in 1964 but the line remains open.

References

External links
Digby Station on navigable 1947 O.S. map

Disused railway stations in Lincolnshire
Former Great Northern and Great Eastern Joint Railway stations
Railway stations in Great Britain opened in 1882
Railway stations in Great Britain closed in 1961